José María Díaz (1813–1888) was a Spanish journalist and playwright whose work is linked to Romanticism.

1813 births
1888 deaths
Spanish male dramatists and playwrights
Spanish journalists
19th-century journalists
Male journalists
19th-century Spanish dramatists and playwrights
19th-century male writers